Ming Dao (born 26 February 1980) is a Taiwanese actor, singer and model. He is known for starring in The Prince Who Turns into a Frog, which held the highest single episode average rating of 6.99 for a Taiwanese drama from 2005 to 2008, and for being the winner of Best Host in Educational Programme at the 39th Golden Bell Awards.

Career
Ming Dao was first discovered in 1999 when he took part in television variety show Guess hosted by Jacky Wu on China Television. He went on to model for various advertisements and appeared in several music videos including Fei Xiang's "She" and R&B's "Love Bubble". Ming Dao also participated in Taiwanese program Super Sunday in 2000 and worked as a spokesperson for Shiatzy Chen.

Ming Dao hosted King of Adventure (冒險王) on SETTV from 2002, visiting India, Korea, Egypt, Germany, Namibia, New Zealand, Laos, Guam, Fiji, Alaska, Mexico, Oman, and Indonesia as an adventure tour guide. In 2004, Ming Dao won the Best Host in Educational Programme at the 39th Golden Bell Awards.

In 2004, he made his acting debut Heaven's Wedding Gown (天國的嫁衣) as a bike-racing champion, Chen Hai Nuo, co-starring Cyndi Wang and Leon Jay Williams. A year later, he starred in The Prince Who Turns into a Frog as Shan Jun Hao and Dang Ou. This drama is the only one in which all five members of 183 Club appeared. Episode seven broadcast on 17 July 2005 achieved an average rating of 6.99 and peaked at 8.05, which broke the previous average record of 6.43 held by Meteor Garden and was the highest peak for a single episode for a Taiwanese drama until it was broken by episode 13 of Fated to Love You which peaked at 8.13 in 2008.

In his next drama, The Magicians of Love (愛情魔髮師), he co-starred with his band mates Sam Wang, Jacky Zhu, and Ehlo Huang from 183 Club. Then in 2006, he starred in The Legend of Star Apple and Angel Lover. Followed by Ying Ye 3 Jia 1, in 2007 in which he plays Ah Jiang, opposite past co-star Joe Chen from The Prince Who Turns into a Frog. Other cast members include Jason Hsu of 5566, who plays his friend Bulu (Wang Dao Ren). Also released in 2007 was Modern Youth (梦幻天堂).

In 2008 he finished filming Knock Knock Loving You and Always Smile! in Hunan, China. In December Ming Dao and Chen Qiao En filmed Staying by You, Staying in the Sunshine/Taking of You, accompanied by the Lights, released in 2009.

He later went back to the mainland and started shooting Wuxia drama as General Wu Gang; a mainland station (Anhui TV) then contracted him as their star. He was paid to participate in the idol drama Happy and Love Forever with actress and model Annie Chen. This drama was a huge success and had high ratings. The producer made a sequel, but Ming Dao and Annie only had cameo roles.

In 2010, Ming Dao returned to Taiwan and starred with Cheryl Yang in Zhong Wu Yan. Although he was paid a lot less, he decided to do this drama because he did not want his Taiwanese fans to be disappointed.

Ming Dao left his agency J Star and along with Miss Li, his manager, he established a new agency MID. Other artists who signed on under his agency were Gino and Anthony. He released a pictorial book "STAR" which was a big hit.

Filmography

Film

Television

Discography

References

External links

MID Entertainment (明道工作室) Weibo
Ming Dao Weibo

1980 births
Living people
183 Club members
21st-century Taiwanese male actors
21st-century Taiwanese  male singers
Taiwanese male television actors
Taiwanese male models
Taiwanese television producers
Participants in Chinese reality television series
Male actors from Taipei
Musicians from Taipei